is a city located in Fukui Prefecture, Japan. ,  the city had an estimated population of 66,123 in 28,604 households and the population density of 260 persons per km2.

Geography
Tsuruga is located in central Fukui Prefecture, bordered by Shiga Prefecture to the south and Wakasa Bay of the Sea of Japan to the north. Tsuruga lies some 50 km south of Fukui, 90 km northwest of Nagoya, 40 km northwest of Maibara, 115 km northeast of Osaka, 75 km northeast of Kyoto, and 65 km east of Maizuru. Among cities on the Sea of Japan coast, Tsuruga is the nearest city to the Pacific Ocean. The distance between Tsuruga and Nagoya is only 115 km. Tsuruga and Nagoya are historically close to Shiga Prefecture and Kyoto.

Neighbouring municipalities 
Fukui Prefecture
Echizen
Mihama
Shiga Prefecture
Takashima
Nagahama

Climate
Tsuruga has a humid subtropical climate (Köppen climate classification Cfa) with hot summers and cool winters. Precipitation is plentiful throughout the year, and is particularly heavy in December and January.

Demographics
Per Japanese census data, the population of Tsuruga peaked around the year 2000 and has declined slightly since.

History
Although Tsuruga promotes itself as the leading city of the "Wakasa region", the city is actually has always been of ancient Echizen Province. A settlement at Tsuruga is mentioned in the Nara period Kojiki and Nihon Shoki chronicles. Kanagasaki Castle was the site of major battles during the early Muromachi period and the Sengoku period, Under the Edo period Tokugawa shogunate, large portions of the city were part of the holdings of Obama Domain and Tsuruga Domain, and prospered as a major port on the kitamaebune shipping routes between western Japan and Hokkaido. Following the Meiji restoration, the area became part of Tsuruga District of Fukui Prefecture.  With the creation of the modern municipalities system, the town of Tsuruga was founded on April 1, 1889.

An Imperial decree in July 1899 established Tsuruga as an open port for trading with the United States and the United Kingdom.

Tsuruga merged with the neighbouring village of Matsubara and was incorporated as a city on April 1, 1937. Tsuruga was the only Japanese port opened to the Polish orphans in 1920, and to the Jewish refugees in 1940 thanks to  Jan Zwartendijk, the Dutch Consul in Kaunas, who  issued  visa for Curaçao and Surinam, Mr. Chiune Sugihara, Vice-Consul for the Empire of Japan in Lithuania who issued transit visa for Japan. These events are detailed at the Port of Humanity Tsuruga Museum.  However, much of the city centre was destroyed in 1945 during the Bombing of Tsuruga during World War II,

The city expanded on January 15, 1955 by annexing the neighbouring villages of Arachi, Awano, Togo, Nakago and Higashiura.

Government
Tsuruga has a mayor-council form of government with a directly elected mayor and a unicameral city legislature of 26 members.

Economy
Tsuruga has a very healthy mixed economy focused on providing services to the Wakasa region, and also features a container port, a bulk terminal, a coal-fired power plant, two textile mills, a large furniture factory, a playground equipment manufacturer, and a Panasonic (Matsushita) facility. Education and energy research also drive the economy.

Tsuruga is also known for its two nuclear power facilities - the Monju demonstration nuclear plant and the Tsuruga Nuclear Power Plant.

Education
Tsuruga has 13 public elementary schools and five middle schools operated by the city government, and two public high schools operated by the Fukui Prefectural Board of Education. There is also one private high school and one private middle/high school. Tsuruga Nursing University is also located in the city.

Transportation

Railway
  JR West - Hokuriku Main Line (Kosei Line)
 , 
  JR West - Obama Line

Highway
 Hokuriku Expressway
 Maizuru-Wakasa Expressway

Seaport
Tsuruga Port

Sister city relations

  Donghae, South Korea, since April 13, 1981
  Taizhou, Zhejiang, China, since November 13, 2001
  Nakhodka, Primorsky Krai, Russia, since October 11, 1982

Local attractions
Kehi Shrine, a large shrine complex built in 702. It hosts Kehi festival every year. Kehi shrine was also visited by the poet Matsuo Basho in 1689.
Kanegasaki-gū, a Shinto shrine
Tsuruga Red Brick Warehouse, Meiji-period port building
Nakagō Kofun Cluster, a National Historic Site
Kanagasaki Castle site, a National Historic Site
Grave of Takeda Kounsai, a National Historic Site
About twenty or so bronze statues – each perhaps four or five feet tall – of characters and scenes from the popular 1970s anime Uchū Senkan Yamato (Space Battleship Yamato or, in the United States, Star Blazers) and Galaxy Express 999 were erected in the city's downtown area in 1999.  Though the creator of these shows, Leiji Matsumoto, was born elsewhere, an exhibit of his artwork was held in the city in 1999 as part of the city's 100th anniversary celebration, accompanied by the erection of the statues.

Activities
Well-known Japanese DJ Chikashi Nishiwaki also founded his eclectic club, Tree, here. The club has been host to many national and international celebrity guests such as Jazztronik, Gilles Peterson, Toshio Matsuura from UFO, DJs Ravi, Julien Love and Two Dee, and Soil and Pimp Sessions.  He has also mixed music with Tyronne Noonan, former frontman of George.

References
.

External links 

  
  Galaxy Express 999 and Space Battleship Yamato statues in Tsuruga
 

 
Cities in Fukui Prefecture
Port settlements in Japan
Populated coastal places in Japan